Michel Serrault (24 January 1928 – 29 July 2007) was a French stage and film actor who appeared from 1954 until 2007 in more than 130 films.

Life and career
His first professional job was in a touring production in Germany of Molière's Les Fourberies de Scapin.

In 1948, he began his career in the theatre with Robert Dhéry in Les Branquignols. His first film was Ah! Les belles bacchantes, starring Robert Dhéry, Colette Brosset (Dhéry's then-wife), and Louis de Funès; directed by Jean Loubignac in 1954. Serrault played in the 1955 suspense thriller Les diaboliques, starring Simone Signoret and directed by Henri-Georges Clouzot.

From February 1973 through 1978, he portrayed the role of Albin/Zaza opposite Jean Poiret in the play La cage aux folles, written by Poiret. He recreated the role for the film version of the play, which was released in 1978.

Serrault died from relapsing polychondritis at his home in Équemauville on 29 July 2007 at age 79. He was buried in Sainte-Catherine's cemetery in Honfleur and was transferred in 2009 to the cemetery of Neuilly-sur-Seine near his wife Juanita Saint-Peyron and daughter Caroline, who died in 1977. He had another daughter, actress Nathalie Serrault.

Theatre (partial)
Knock
L'Avare
La cage aux folles
Le tombeur
Gugusse
Pour avoir Adrienne
Quand épousez-vous ma femme
On purge bébé

Filmography

Awards

References

External links

 
 Michel Serrault in French
Obituary - KSL Television & Radio, Salt Lake City UT
 Obituary in Cinema2000.pt (Portuguese)
 The Guardian Obituary

1928 births
2007 deaths
People from Essonne
French male film actors
French male stage actors
Deaths from cancer in France
David di Donatello winners
Best Actor Lumières Award winners
Recipients of the Order of Agricultural Merit
20th-century French male actors
21st-century French male actors